Yugi (titled Adrishyam in Malayalam) is a 2022 Indian bilingual murder mystery film directed by Zac Harris, shot in Tamil and Malayalam simultaneously, stars Kathir, Natty and Narain in the lead roles for the Tamil version, while Sharaf U Dheen and Joju George played the lead roles in the Malayalam version alongside Narain. It was released on 18 November 2022.

Cast

Kathir as Rajkumar (Tamil version)
Sharaf U Dheen as Rajkumar (Malayalam version)
Narain as Nandakumar
Natty as Sethu (Tamil version)
Joju George as Sethu (Malayalam version)
Athmiya Rajan as Shalini
Anandhi as Karthika
Pavithra Lakshmi as Pavithra Mariamma
Prathap Pothan as Purushothaman 
Namo Narayana
Munishkanth
Vinodhini Vaidyanathan as Dr. Chandrika
Prankster Rahul
John Vijay as Guruprasad
Zinil Zainuddin
Anjali Rao

Production
In late 2019, director Zac Harriss and writer Packiaraj, sought out to make a Tamil film and pitched the idea to artistes to secure their dates. Upon discussions with Narain, the makers chose to film it as a bilingual with separate actors in Tamil and Malayalam. In Malayalam, the film starred Narain, Joju George and Sharaf U Dheen, while in Tamil, the film starred Narain, Natty and Kathir. The filming was done simultaneously for both the versions.

Soundtrack
Soundtrack was composed by Ranjin Raj.
Kadavul Thandha - Pradeep Kumar, Saindhavi
Neeradum - Ranjin Raj
Moolaya Saanam - Sivam

Reception
The film was released on 18 November 2022 across Tamil Nadu and Kerala. A critic from Cinema Express wrote the film was "a tedious revenge thriller with one too many twists" and that "the exposition and the unraveling in this film feels so overwhelming that we lose interest halfway". A reviewer from The Times of India noted "Yugi is interesting in bits and pieces, but fails to deliver as a whole". The reviewer added "the technical aspects of the film are quite decent and the background score really helps to elevate certain moments, which would have otherwise been flat". A critic from The Hindu wrote that "Despite its powerful star cast and potential to weave a gripping narrative, the loud treatment, haphazard editing, and horrific lip sync make Adrishyam an underwhelming watch". A reviewer from Manorama Online opined that "Director Zac Harris has done a decent job keeping the mystery intact, though he hasn’t been able to infuse much freshness into the plotline".

References

External links

2022 films
2020s Tamil-language films
2020s Malayalam-language films
2022 directorial debut films
Indian multilingual films